Combreia or Kombreia was an ancient Greek polis (city-state) in the Chalcidice, ancient Macedonia. It is cited by Herodotus as one of the cities—together with Lipaxus, Lisaea, Gigonus, Campsa, Smila, Aeneia—located in the vicinity of the Thermaic Gulf, in a region called Crusis near the peninsula of Pallene, where Xerxes recruited troops in his expedition of the year 480 BCE against Greece.

Its site is unlocated.

References

Populated places in ancient Macedonia
Former populated places in Greece
Lost ancient cities and towns